Up or Down? is a 1917 American silent Western film directed by Lynn Reynolds and starring George Hernandez, Fritzi Ridgeway and John Gilbert.

Cast
 George Hernandez as Mike 
 Fritzi Ridgeway as Esther Hollister 
 John Gilbert as Allan Corey 
 Elwood Bredell as Boy 
 Jack Curtis as 'Texas' Jack 
 Graham Pettie as Sheriff 
 Edward Burns as Ranch Foreman

References

Bibliography
 Golden, Eve. John Gilbert: The Last of the Silent Film Stars. University Press of Kentucky, 2013.

External links
 

1917 films
1917 Western (genre) films
American black-and-white films
Films directed by Lynn Reynolds
Triangle Film Corporation films
Silent American Western (genre) films
1910s English-language films
1910s American films